Thomas Bruce Haliburton (5 June 1915 – 25 October 1975) was a Scottish golfer. He finished tied for 5th in the 1957 Open Championship and played in the 1961 and 1963 Ryder Cups. He died, playing golf, at Wentworth where he had been the professional for over 20 years.

Early life
Haliburton was born in a cottage in Rhu, then in Dunbartonshire but now in Argyll and Bute, but after a few years his parents moved to Shandon, a few miles away. It was there that he had his first contact with golf at Shandon Golf Club. He went to the Hermitage School in Helensburgh until he was 15 years old.

During World War II, Haliburton was in the Royal Air Force. He married in 1941 and became a corporal in the same year.

Golf career
Haliburton was initially an assistant for four years at Haggs Castle Golf Club in Glasgow before moving to Prestwick St Nicholas Golf Club. In 1939 he became first assistant to Henry Cotton at Ashridge Golf Club. After a series of moves, he became the professional at the Wentworth Club in 1952 where he remained until his death in 1975.

In 1952 he set a world record score by scoring 126 for the first two rounds of the Spalding Tournament, although he eventually finished fourth.

He was in the British 1961 and 1963 Ryder Cup teams.

In the 1963 Open Championship at Royal Lytham, he scored 29 for the first nine holes of the opening round, an Open record, equalled by Peter Thomson later on the same day. Tony Jacklin equalled the record in 1970 and Denis Durnian beat it, scoring 28, in 1983.

In 1969 he became chairman of the British PGA. He was the non-playing British captain in the first PGA Cup at Pinehurst, North Carolina in 1973. His last tournament was a Pro-Am at Helensburgh Golf Club in 1974.

Death
Drawing up plan for his retirement, he had recommended Bernard Gallacher as his successor at Wentworth. Haliburton and Gallacher had just started a practice round when, on the first green, Haliburton collapsed and died. He had been a professional golfer for 42 years.

Tournament wins
1938 Northern Open, West of Scotland Championship
1946 West of England Professional Championship
1949 Daily Mail Tournament
1951 Sunningdale Foursomes (with Jean Donald)
1953 Sunningdale Foursomes (with Jean Donald)
1959 Gleneagles Hotel Foursomes Tournament (with Bill Igoe)
1963 Yorkshire Evening News Tournament

Results in major championships

Note: Haliburton only played in the Masters Tournament and The Open Championship.

NT = No tournament
CUT = missed the half-way cut
WD = Withdrew
"T" indicates a tie for a place

Team appearances
Canada Cup (representing Scotland): 1954
Ryder Cup (representing Great Britain): 1961, 1963
Ireland–Scotland Professional Match (representing Scotland): 1935, 1936
England–Scotland Professional Match (representing Scotland): 1938
Llandudno International Golf Trophy (representing Scotland): 1938
Amateurs–Professionals Match (representing the Professionals): 1960 (winners)
PGA Cup (representing Great Britain and Ireland): 1973 (non-playing captain)

References

External links
Helensburgh Heritage: Van Shandon to Ryder Cup
Shandon Golf Club, Argyll & Bute

Scottish male golfers
Ryder Cup competitors for Europe
Royal Air Force personnel of World War II
Royal Air Force airmen
People from Rhu, Argyll and Bute
Sportspeople from Argyll and Bute
1915 births
1975 deaths